WZFE-LP (97.9 FM, Radio FE) is a radio station broadcasting a Contemporary Christian format. Licensed to Moca, Puerto Rico, the station serves the western Puerto Rico area. The station is currently owned by Concilio de Iglesias Rios de Vida.

External links

Radio stations established in 2014
2014 establishments in Puerto Rico
ZFE-LP
Moca, Puerto Rico